Phatuha Maheshpur  is a village development committee in Rautahat District in the Narayani Zone of south-eastern Nepal. At the time of the 1991 Nepal census it had a population of 4130.

References

Populated places in Rautahat District